Battle of Pävankhind was a rearguard last stand that took place on 13 July 1660, at a mountain pass in the vicinity of fort Vishalgad, near the city of Kolhapur with the Maratha warrior Baji Prabhu Deshpande and Sambhu Singh Jadhav against Siddi Masud of the Bijapur Sultanate. The engagement ended with the destruction of the Maratha forces, and a tactical victory for the Bijapur Sultanate that failed to achieve a strategic victory.

Prelude

In 1660, Shivaji Maharaj was trapped in the fort of Panhala, under siege and vastly outnumbered by an Adilshah army led by an Abyssinian General called Siddi Masud. Shivaji Maharaj planned to escape to the Maratha fort of Vishalgad. Two Maratha sardars under the Adilshahi General Siddi Jouhar, namely Suryarao Surve and Jaswantrao Dalvi had also encircled the fort of Vishalgad simultaneously. Shivaji Maharaj waited for months, planning and depleting the Adilshah's food source.

Shivaji Maharaj, Baji Prabhu, and around 600 of their best troops, would dash through the Adilshahi force at night. A man named Shiva Kashid, who resembled Shivaji Maharaj in appearance, had volunteered to dress like the king and get captured. This bought some additional time due to the confusion over identity, before Siddi Masud realised the error and gave chase.

Shivaji Maharaj made his escape on the dark night of 13 July, with his troops and the Adilshah army was in pursuit with an army of 10,000. It was clear that there was no way to shake off the enemy, and that the Marathas would not simultaneously prevail over both the Moghul garrison at Vishalgad and the chasing Adilshahi army.

The only option was for a section of the Marathas to stay back and fight the larger Adilshahi forces in a rearguard action, while the rest of the Marathas would carry on to their destination. Shivaji Maharaj decided to split his forces. Baji Prabhu agreed to face the troops of Bijapur with 300 soldiers. Shivaji Maharaj told Baji Prabhu that he would hear cannons being fired 5 times from Vishalgad, signaling Shivaji Maharaj’s safety. The strategic position of Ghod Khind (Horse Pass) was chosen for the defence, as it was very narrow and only a few soldiers could pass at any one time.

Battle

Baji Prabhu occupied Ghod Khind, blocking the path of the Adilshah troops. His brother Fulaji Prabhu as well as sardars such as Shambusing Jadhav were present with him. Fulaji Prabhu and Shambusing were killed after a gallant and fierce fight. Baji Prabhu was severely wounded but carried on fighting at his station. The Adilshahi army repeatedly tried to break through the defenses of the pass, but were repeatedly repulsed. The unequal battle raged for hours, with the defenders maintaining their positions, but with rapidly depleting numbers. Only a handful of Marathas survived, and around a thousand soldiers of the Adilshahi army became casualties in attempting to take the pass.

Five hours after the battle started, the cannon fire announcing Shivaji’s safe return to Vishalgad was heard.  Almost three hundred Marathas had been killed. Legend has it that a gravely injured Baji Prabhu continued engaging the enemy and held the pass, only laying down his life once he heard the sound of cannon fire. The handful surviving Marathas then retreated and disappeared in the forest as per the plan.

Shivaji and his 300 soldiers had to break through the encirclement of Suryarao and Jaswantrao at Vishalgadh. A fierce battle ensued in which Shivaji himself fought wearing Dandpatta in his both hands. Seeing this fight, the commander of Vishalgadh fort sent help to Shivaji enabling him and his troops to reach the fort safely. Shivaji then fired cannons as a signal for Baji Prabhu to retreat.

Aftermath

The pass, Ghod Khind (Horse Pass) was renamed Pavan Khind (Sacred Pass) in honour of the sacrifice of the 300 Maratha troops and the rest of Shivaji's army was able to escape

In popular culture

 The battle was depicted in episodes of Raja Shivchatrapati .
 In 2022, a Marathi-language film depicting the battle titled as Pawankhind directed by Digpal Lanjekar starring Chinmay Mandlekar as Shivaji Maharaj and Ajay Purkar as Baji Prabhu Deshpande released on 21 January.

See also 
 Battle of Kolhapur
 Battle of Thermopylae 
 Third Battle of Panipat (1761), A massive historic battle between Maratha empire and Durrani Empire of Afghanistan at Panipat. Shah of Durrani empire Ahmad Shah Abdali led the invasion, Sadashivrao Bhau led Maratha army.
 List of last stands

References

1660 in India
Pavankhind
Pavan Khind
History of Maharashtra
Pavan Khind